Tarka Michel Bernard L'Herpiniere (born 19 September 1981) is a British explorer, ultra-endurance athlete, motivational speaker, and filmmaker who holds several endurance records.

L'Herpiniere spent his early years climbing, skiing, skydiving, paragliding and BASE jumping before turning his hand to large-scale expeditions. Initially, these were mountaineering expeditions including Mont Blanc, Aconcagua, and Cho Oyu before developing an interest in the polar regions. In 2004, after several successful small scale expeditions to the Arctic, he attempted to become the youngest person ever to reach the North and South Poles, unaided and in succession, but due to sponsorship withdrawal, the project could not be completed.

In 2006, he attempted to summit Mount Everest without oxygen. At the North Col (7,020 m) L'Herpiniere developed HACE and had to be evacuated. In 2007, he, along with his now wife, became the first person to walk the entire length of the Great Wall of China.

In 2008, L'Herpiniere cycled over 8,000 km through Africa on a 30-year-old bicycle with no brakes or gears to promote the charity Re-Cycle. In 2009, he completed the longest crossing of the Southern Patagonian Ice Cap by a British team. 

In 2014, L'Herpiniere, along with Ben Saunders, replicated Captain Robert Falcon Scott's 1,795 mile trek across Antarctica from Scott's cabin on the coast, to the South Pole, and back.

Background and history

L'Herpiniere was born in Yeovil, England shortly before moving to Tignes in the French Alps. He is the eldest of three siblings and returned to England to be educated at Cheltenham College after obtaining a sports scholarship. In 1996, he was awarded a scholarship to the Royal Military Academy Sandhurst before attending Brunel University and the University of Bath.

He is a fellow of the Royal Geographical Society, a mentor of the British Schools Exploring Society and has used his expeditions to support a number of charities including: Make-A-Wish Foundation, Cancer Research, Practical Action, Merlin, and Re-Cycle.

Marriage
He is married to Katie-Jane (Cooper) L'Herpiniere. They became engaged during an aborted attempt to cross the Patagonian ice cap from north to south unaided in 2009. She was also his companion on his trek across the Great Wall of China.

Expeditions

Expedition filmmaker

See also 

 List of Antarctic expeditions

References

External links
 Tarka L'Herpinieres' website

1981 births
Living people
English explorers
British explorers
French explorers
Explorers of the Arctic
People educated at Cheltenham College
British motivational speakers
People from Yeovil
British polar explorers
English television personalities